Mehmet Tursun Chong (born January 13, 1988, in Kashgar, Xinjiang) is a Chinese amateur boxer, who qualified for the 2008 Olympics in his native country at Light welterweight. He lost his opening match to Gennady Kovalev of Russia on a 15-8 decision. Qiong is an ethnic Uyghur.

He has qualified for the 2012 Olympics in London at welterweight.  He again lost in the first round, to another Russian boxer, Andrey Zamkovoy.

References

His profile on Official site of the London 2012 Olympic
China at the 2008 Summer Olympics
http://big5.olympic.cn/b5/2008teamchina.olympic.cn/index.php/personview/personsen/5162

1988 births
Living people
Boxers at the 2008 Summer Olympics
Boxers at the 2012 Summer Olympics
Light-welterweight boxers
Olympic boxers of China
People from Kashgar
Uyghur people
Uyghur sportspeople
Chinese people of Uyghur descent
Sportspeople from Xinjiang
Boxers at the 2010 Asian Games
Chinese male boxers
Asian Games medalists in boxing
Asian Games bronze medalists for China
Medalists at the 2010 Asian Games
Boxers at the 2018 Asian Games